Gosnell is a city in northern Mississippi County, Arkansas, United States. The population was 2,910 at the 2020 census, down from 3,548 at the 2010 census.

Geography
Gosnell is located in the Arkansas Delta at  (35.963308, -89.967224), in northern Mississippi County. It is bordered to the east by the city of Blytheville, the county seat.

Ecologically, Gosnell is located within the St. Francis Lowlands ecoregion near its border with the Northern Holocene Meander Belts ecoregion; both are subregions of the larger Mississippi Alluvial Plain. The St. Francis Lowlands are a flat region mostly covered with row crop agriculture today, though also containing sand blows and sunken lands remaining from the 1811–12 New Madrid earthquakes. Waterways have mostly been channelized, causing loss of aquatic and riparian wildlife habitat.

History 
The Gosnell region was surrounded by water in its early days. It is bordered on the west by Big Lake, which in the days before the automobile and railroads was used as a boat transportation route linking the settlement to the larger cities of Arkansas, Missouri, and Tennessee. Landowners along Big Lake took advantage of a thriving commercial hunting and fishing business. Pelts and packed fish could be shipped to market along the lake or by the two bayous to the Mississippi River.

To the east of the settlement is the Pemiscot Bayou. The road from Blytheville passed the Indian mound and store before traveling across the Pemiscot Bayou. Families with land along the Pemiscot traveled in boats into the Lumerate Bayou, which ran through Blytheville's business district. The road to Gosnell came to be called the Pole Road. When stretches of the road became bad, the community would turn out to cut logs to place across the mud of the road, making it passable again.

Because the land was sparsely settled, it was of little concern to either side during the American Civil War. All of Mississippi County had fewer than 4,000 residents at this time. Men from the area joined Confederate units from other parts of Arkansas. Aside from a few Union raids from Missouri, the county did not suffer much from the war.

Much of the land between Blytheville and Big Lake was purchased in the late 1800s by Lemael Gosnell, a dentist and pioneer farmer. In time, the community came to be named for him.

Gosnell was incorporated as a first-class city on March 12, 1968. Gosnell's first mayor after incorporation was Andy Bevill. Since then, Gosnell has had only four mayors: Carl Ledbetter, Dick Reams, Don Marshall and currently Teresa Walker.

Historical sites 
Leaving Blytheville on Chickasawba Street, one reaches Gosnell Road. Upon traveling  one comes to the place of the famous Chickasawba Indian Mound 25 feet high and base circumference approximately 130 feet.  This mound must have been either a Signal or a Temple Mound as no pottery or skeleton bones have been found here.

Demographics

2010 census
As of the census of 2010, there were 3,548 people, 1,387 households, and 951 families residing in the city.  The racial makeup of the city was 72.9% White, 22.0% Black or African American, 0.4% Native American, 1.0% Asian, 1.6% from other races, and 2.1% from two or more races.  Hispanic or Latino of any race were 3.5% of the population.

There were 1,238 households, out of which 48.1% had children under the age of 18 living with them, 45.9% were married couples living together, 23.2% had a female householder with no husband present, 7.8% had a male householder with no wife present, and 23.2% were non-families. 19.2% of all households were made up of individuals, and 4.8% had someone living alone who was 65 years of age or older.  The average household size was 2.87 and the average family size was 3.26.

The median income for a household in the city was $43,722, and the median income for a family was $46,389.  The per capita income for the city was $15,917.

2000 census
As of the census of 2000, there were 3,968 people, 1,369 households, and 1,074 families residing in the city. The racial makeup of the city was 80.12% White, 15.15% Black or African American, 0.43% Native American, 1.01% Asian, 1.86% from other races, and 1.44% from two or more races. Hispanic or Latino of any race were 3.45% of the population.

There were 1,369 households, out of which 48.3% had children under the age of 18 living with them, 54.9% were married couples living together, 18.4% had a female householder with no husband present, and 21.5% were non-families. 17.5% of all households were made up of individuals, and 4.1% had someone living alone who was 65 years of age or older.  The average household size was 2.90 and the average family size was 3.29.

In the city, the population was spread out, with 34.9% under the age of 18, 10.8% from 18 to 24, 32.0% from 25 to 44, 17.5% from 45 to 64, and 4.8% who were 65 years of age or older.  The median age was 28 years. For every 100 females, there were 96.7 males.  For every 100 females age 18 and over, there were 92.1 males.

The median income for a household in the city was $31,423, and the median income for a family was $37,176. Males had a median income of $30,995 versus $17,625 for females. The per capita income for the city was $13,371.  About 15.5% of families and 17.1% of the population were below the poverty line, including 16.5% of those under age 18 and 31.4% of those age 65 or over.

Economy
Gosnell used to depend on the nearby Blytheville/Eaker Air Force Base but since its closing in the early 1990s, the city has lost many of its inhabitants. The city is home to the Gosnell School District, which as of 2011 has an enrollment of 1438 K-12.

Annual cultural events 
Gosnell's Annual Cotton Festival is in October.

Education 
Public education is available to elementary and secondary school students at Gosnell School District, which leads to graduation from Gosnell High School. The district and high school mascot and athletic emblem is the Pirate with the spirit colors of blue and gold.

Government 
Mayor - Jason Taylor 
Ward 1
Position 1 - Steve Ledbetter
Position 2 - Richard Brown
Ward 2
Position 1 - Johnny Pate
Position 2 - Josh Trapp
Ward 3
Position 1 - Dal Freeman
Position 2 - Terry Byrd Sr.

State and federal representation 

Arkansas's 1st congressional district - Rick Crawford
United States Senator - Mark Pryor

The United States Postal Service operates one post office in Gosnell.

Climate 
Gosnell has a humid subtropical climate (Köppen climate classification Cfa).

Totals and averages:

Other information

Tornado activity
Gosnell area historical tornado activity is slightly above the Arkansas state average and is 220% greater than the overall U.S. average.

Earthquake activity 
Gosnell-area historical earthquake activity is significantly above the Arkansas state average. It is 91% greater than the overall U.S. average.

On 3/25/1976 at 00:41:20, a magnitude 5.0 (4.9 MB, 5.0 LG, Class: Moderate, Intensity: VI - VII) earthquake occurred 30.3 miles away from the city center.
On 5/4/1991 at 01:18:54, a magnitude 5.0 (4.4 MB, 4.6 LG, 5.0 LG, Depth: 3.1 mi) earthquake occurred 42.3 miles away from Gosnell center.
On 4/27/1989 at 16:47:49, a magnitude 4.7 (4.6 MB, 4.7 LG, 4.3 LG, Class: Light, Intensity: IV - V) earthquake occurred 11.5 miles away from the city center.
On 9/26/1990 at 13:18:51, a magnitude 5.0 (4.7 MB, 4.8 LG, 5.0 LG, Depth: 7.7 mi) earthquake occurred 86.6 miles away from the city center.
On 3/25/1976 at 01:00:11, a magnitude 4.5 (4.1 MB, 4.5 LG) earthquake occurred 37.7 miles away from Gosnell center.
On 11/29/1996 at 05:41:33, a magnitude 4.3 (4.3 LG, 4.1 LG, Depth: 12.6 mi) earthquake occurred 3.8 miles away from the city center.

Magnitude types: regional Lg-wave magnitude (LG), body-wave magnitude (MB)

Natural disasters 
The number of natural disasters in Mississippi County (11) is near the US average (12).

Major disasters (Presidential) declared: 7

Emergencies declared: 4

Causes of natural disasters: Storms: 6, Floods: 5, Tornadoes: 4, Winter Storms: 4, Hurricane: 1 (Note: Some incidents may be assigned to more than one category).

See also 
Gosnell (disambiguation)

References

External links

Cities in Arkansas
Cities in Mississippi County, Arkansas